In the seventh season of the Balkan International Basketball League, ten participants from Albania, Bulgaria, Kosovo, the Republic of Macedonia, Montenegro and Romania has competed.

Teams

Format
In the first round the teams were divided into two groups, each containing five teams. Each team played every other team in its group at home and away. The top four teams from each group advanced to the second round. The teams that finished fifth in their group end their participation.

The eight remaining teams are again separated into two groups with four teams each. The teams that already have played during the first round kept the results between them from the first stage and played with the two remaining teams from the other group home and away games. The winners of both groups advanced directly to the semifinals, while the second- and third-placed met in the quarterfinal in home and away elimination games.

The winners of the groups from the second round met against the winners of the third round in two semifinals, played again in home and away elimination games. The winners of those advanced to the final, decided on home and away games.

First round
The games were played between 14 October 2014 and 28 January 2015.

Group A

Group B

Notes

Second round
The games were played between 3 February and 4 March 2015.

Group C

Group D

Notes

Quarterfinal
The quarterfinals are two-legged ties determined on aggregate score. The first leg was played on 10 and 11 March 2015, while the second leg was on 24 and 25 March 2015.

Semifinal

Rilski Sportist won 144−129 on aggregate

KB Prishtina won 165−147 on aggregate

Final

References

External links
 BIBL official webpage
 Balkan League standings and livescores

2014–15
2014–15 in European basketball leagues
2014–15 in Kosovan basketball
2014–15 in Republic of Macedonia basketball
2014–15 in Bulgarian basketball
2014–15 in Montenegrin basketball
2014–15 in Romanian basketball
Basketball in Albania